Women's Prison may refer to:

Incarceration of women
Women's Prison, Christianshavn, Copenhagen, Denmark (1742–1921)
Prison for Women, Canadian correctional facility (1934–2000)
Women's Prison (1951 film), Mexican drama
Women's Prison (1955 film), American drama with Ida Lupino and Cleo Moore
Women's Prison (1958 film), French drama (original title Prisons de femmes)
Women's Prison (1988 film), Hong Kong drama
Women's Prison (2002 film), an Iranian drama directed by Manijeh Hekmat
"Women's Prison", song from Loretta Lynn's Van Lear Rose 2004 album